Scrobipalpa reiprichi is a moth in the family Gelechiidae. It was described by Povolný in 1984. It is found in Norway, Hungary, Slovakia, China (Shaanxi) and Russia (Sakhalin).

The forewings are pale ochreous to greyish cinereous, with an admixture of blackish scales, concentrated along the costal margin. The three blackish tribal stigmata are present. The hindwings are dark cinereous, with a slight brownish hue.

References

Scrobipalpa
Moths described in 1984